Sharad S. Rao is a Kenyan who serves as the Chairman of the Kenya Judges and Magistrates Vetting Board since September 2011.

References

Living people
1936 births
Members of Lincoln's Inn
Alumni of Nairobi School
Kenyan people of Indian descent